The 2018 BB&T Atlanta Open was a professional men's tennis tournament played on hard courts. It was the 31st edition of the tournament, and part of the 2018 ATP World Tour. It took place at Atlantic Station in Atlanta, United States between July 23 and 29, 2018. It was the first men's event of the 2018 US Open Series. First-seeded John Isner won the singles title.

Singles main-draw entrants

Seeds

 1 Rankings are as of July 16, 2018.

Other entrants
The following players received wildcards into the main draw:
  Chung Hyeon  
  Emil Reinberg
  Donald Young

The following players received entry using a protected ranking into the main draw:
  James Duckworth

The following players received entry as special exempts:
  Ramkumar Ramanathan
  Tim Smyczek

The following players received entry from the qualifying draw:
  Alex Bolt  
  Prajnesh Gunneswaran  
  Thanasi Kokkinakis  
  Noah Rubin

The following player received entry as a lucky loser:
  Hubert Hurkacz

Withdrawals
Before the tournament
  Mirza Bašić →replaced by  James Duckworth
  Yuki Bhambri →replaced by  Alex de Minaur
  Jared Donaldson →replaced by  Marius Copil
  Gilles Müller →replaced by  Ričardas Berankis
  Jack Sock →replaced by  Hubert Hurkacz

Retirements
  Nick Kyrgios

Doubles main-draw entrants

Seeds

1 Rankings are as of 16 July 2018.

Other entrants 
The following pairs received wildcards into the doubles main draw:
  Christopher Eubanks /  Donald Young 
  Thanasi Kokkinakis /  Nick Kyrgios

Finals

Singles 

  John Isner defeated  Ryan Harrison, 5–7, 6–3, 6–4

Doubles 

  Nicholas Monroe /  John-Patrick Smith  vs.  Ryan Harrison /  Rajeev Ram, 3–6, 7–6(7–5), [10–8]

References

External links 
 

2018 ATP World Tour
2018
2018 in American tennis
2018 in sports in Georgia (U.S. state)
July 2018 sports events in the United States
2018 in Atlanta